The Ven. John David Delight (24 August 1925 - 16 February 2013) was a British clergyman who served as Archdeacon of Stoke 1982 to 1989.

He was educated at Christ's Hospital, the University of Liverpool, Oak Hill Theological College and the Open University. (BA Theology 1955) and Ripon Hall, Oxford.

After wartime service in the RNVR he served curacies at Tooting Graveney and Wallington. He was Travelling Secretary of the Inter-Varsity Fellowship of Students from 1958 to 1961; Vicar St Christopher, Leicester from 1961 to 1969; Rector of Aldridge from 1969 to 1982; Rural Dean of Walsall from 1981 to 1982; and a Prebendary of Lichfield Cathedral from 1980 to 1982.

References

1925 births
2013 deaths
Royal Naval Volunteer Reserve personnel of World War II
People educated at Christ's Hospital
Alumni of the University of Liverpool
Alumni of Oak Hill College
Alumni of the Open University
Alumni of Ripon College Cuddesdon
Archdeacons of Stoke